Kalendarium 1972–93 is a compilation album from Swedish singer/songwriter Ted Gärdestad, released in 1993. It includes the best-known songs from his career as well one new recording, "För Kärlekens Skull", his first in twelve years. Kalendarium also included a Swedish language re-recording of the title track from his 1978 album Blue Virgin Isles, "Himlen Är Oskyldigt Blå".

Track listing
All lyrics written by Kenneth Gärdestad, music by Ted Gärdestad

"Jag vill ha en egen måne" (1972) - 3:17
"Helena" (1972)  - 3:19
"Snurra du min värld" (1972) - 2:59
Jag ska fånga en ängel"  (1973) - 3:50
"Sol, vind och vatten"  (1973) - 3:10
"Eiffeltornet" (1974) - 3:04
"Buffalo Bill"  (1974) - 3:53
"Angela" (1976) - 3:00
"Chapeau-Claque"  (1976) - 3:55
"Klöversnoa" (1976) - 2:00
"Rockin' 'n' Reelin'" (Swedish version) (1975) - 3:00
"Himlen är oskyldigt blå" (Swedish-language version of "Blue Virgin Isles") (1978/1993) - 4:34
"Låt Solen värma dig" (Solo version) (1981) - 3:33
"Satellit" (1979) - 4:22
"Låt kärleken slå rot" (1981) - 4:48
"För kärlekens skull" (1993) - 4:03

Production
 Benny Andersson - producer (tracks 1-11, 15)
 Björn Ulvaeus - producer (tracks 1-11)
 Ted Gärdestad - producer (tracks 4-11, 13)
 Michael B. Tretow - producer (tracks 6-10)
 Eirik W. Wangberg - original producer (track 12, "Blue Virgin Isles"/Himlen Är Oskyldigt Blå")
 Janne Schaffer - producer (track 14)
 Anders Glenmark - producer (track 16), remix (track 12, "Blue Virgin Isles"/"Himlen Är Oskyldigt Blå")

References

External links
 Official home page, The Ted Gärdestad Society

Ted Gärdestad albums
1993 compilation albums